is a special private library in Tokyo, Japan, serving individuals who are unable to read standard printed material, and those who research the field of visual impairment. JBL is one of the biggest and oldest libraries for the blind in Japan.
The library's collection includes about 81,000 braille books (23,000 titles), 210,000 talking books (24,000 titles), and various documents concerning the blind and braille. JBL also provides a braille transcription service, a braille printing service, a recording service, digital library services, PC training programs, braille training programs, and sells about 1,200 products for the blind. The library's services now extend beyond Japan, providing braille textbooks and computer training to developing Asian nations.

Chronology 
 1940: November 10, Japan library for the blind is founded in Tokyo by a blind man, Kazuo Honma (1915-2003).
 1945: Is destroyed in air raids.
 1948: Rises from the ashes of war, and is renamed Japan Braille Library.
 1955: Sponsored by Ministry of Welfare, undertakes the publication of braille books.
 1961: Sponsored by Ministry of Welfare, undertakes the production of talking books.
 1966: Opens a shop of products for the blind.
 1994: Initiates the support project for the blind in Asia.
 1999: Starts digital talking book (DAISY book) service.
 2004: Starts the broadband network delivery service of DAISY books ”Biblio-net".
 2007: Initiates the production of audio guide for DVD movies.

Services & Projects

See also 
 Books for the Blind
 Audiobook
 Japanese Braille

References

External links 
  

Braille organizations
Libraries for the blind
Blindness organizations in Japan
Libraries in Tokyo
Library buildings completed in 1948
Libraries established in 1940